(? – October 22, 1634) was a Japanese woman who lived from the Sengoku period to the early Edo period. She was the younger sister of Kyōgoku Takatsugu. She was first the wife of Wakasa daimyō Takeda Motoaki, but after his death she became Toyotomi Hideyoshi's concubine. Her cousin, Chacha, was also a concubine and both of them were best friends. Hideyoshi granted her the name .

After Hideyoshi's death she became a nun under the name . She also moved to Ōtsu Castle, which was under the command of her brother, in Ōmi Province, and she was there when the Siege of Ōtsu occurred.

References

Year of birth unknown
1634 deaths
17th-century Japanese women
Kyōgoku clan
People of Sengoku-period Japan
Women of medieval Japan
17th-century Japanese people